The men's parallel bars was one of eight gymnastics events on the Gymnastics at the 1896 Summer Olympics programme. The parallel bars event was held on 10 April, the seventh gymnastics event to be held. 18 gymnasts from six nations competed, with the judges announcing Alfred Flatow as the winner and Louis Zutter as the runner-up.

Background

This was the first appearance of the event, which is one of the five apparatus events held every time there were apparatus events at the Summer Olympics (no apparatus events were held in 1900, 1908, 1912, or 1920). The field consisted of 10 Germans and 8 gymnasts from 5 other nations.

Competition format

Judges awarded the prizes, but little is known of the scoring and rankings.

Schedule

The men's parallel bars was held in the morning of the fifth day of events, having been moved from the fourth day as the other gymnastics events went too long to finish the full programme.

Results

References

Sources
  (Digitally available at )
  (Excerpt available at )
 

Men's parallel bars
Men's 1896